Timothy Batabaire (born August 25, 1981 in Iganga) is a Ugandan retired football (soccer) defender.

Club career
Batabaire had started playing in 1999 with SC Villa where he stayed until the end of 2003 season. Then he moved to Europe to play one year in the Second League of Serbia and Montenegro, with Serbian club OFK Niš, between the winter-breaks of 2003–04 and 2004–05. Since 2005, he has been playing in South Africa with Bloemfontein Celtic where he played five solid seasons before moving, in summer 2009, to another South African club, Bidvest Wits.
On August 19, 2014, he moved to South African National First Division club Garankuwa United F.C.

International career
Batabaire has been a member of the Uganda national football team since 2000.

Honours
SC Villa
 Uganda Premier League: 1999, 2000, 2001, 2002, 2002–03
 Uganda Cup: 2000, 2002

Bidvest Wits
 Nedbank Cup: 2010

References

External links
 Profile at Playerhistory.

Living people
1981 births
Ugandan footballers
Uganda international footballers
Ugandan expatriate footballers
Association football defenders
Makerere University alumni
SC Villa players
OFK Niš players
Expatriate footballers in Serbia and Montenegro
Bloemfontein Celtic F.C. players
Bidvest Wits F.C. players
Expatriate soccer players in South Africa
Expatriate footballers in Serbia
Ugandan expatriate sportspeople in South Africa
Ugandan expatriate sportspeople in Serbia
Garankuwa United F.C. players
People educated at Kiira College Butiki